The 1991 ITU Triathlon World Championships were held in Gold Coast, Australia on 12 and 13 October 1991.

Results

Men's Championship

Women's Championship

See also
1991 ITU Triathlon World Cup

References
the-sports.org
archive.triathlon.org

World Triathlon Series
World Championships
Triathlon World Championships
Sports competitions on the Gold Coast, Queensland
International sports competitions hosted by Australia
Triathlon competitions in Australia
October 1991 sports events in Australia